Valerie Gogan (born ) is a Scottish actress. Gogan was born in Scotland and left Glasgow in the 1980s to train at LAMDA. She made her film debut in Dangerous Liaisons. She later starred in One More Kiss and Heart of the High Country, and had a major recurring role in the BBC series Hamish Macbeth. She is also known for principal roles in Waking the Dead, The Bill, Doctors as Beth Carlyle, Peak Practice and David Copperfield. On stage, she has worked with The Royal Shakespeare Company, the Royal National Theatre and in London's West End, appearing in, among others, A Doll's House, Les liaisons dangereuses, The Rehearsal and The Secret Rapture.

References

External links
 

1960s births
Living people
Actresses from Glasgow
Scottish television actresses
Scottish film actresses
Scottish stage actresses